Jeffrey Michael Julmis (born September 30, 1987) is a Haitian sprinter. He was born in Fort Lauderdale, Florida, United States. He competed in the 110 m hurdles event at the 2016 Summer Olympics, and performed well enough in his heat to qualify for the semifinals. During the semifinal round, Julmis violently crashed and tumbled over the first hurdle, causing a disqualification. In spite of this, Julmis ran the remainder of the race and received a standing ovation as he left the track.

Personal bests

Outdoor
200 m: 21.64 s (wind: +1.8 m/s) – Arkansas City, Kansas, 9 May 2009
110 m hurdles: 13.47 s (wind: +2.0 m/s) – Clermont, FL, 14 May 2016

Indoor
 Ran a 6.37 60m time in February 26th, 2016

International competitions

1Disqualified in the semifinals

References

External links

1987 births
Living people
Haitian male sprinters
American male hurdlers
American male sprinters
Sportspeople from Fort Lauderdale, Florida
Track and field athletes from Florida
American sportspeople of Haitian descent
Olympic athletes of Haiti
Athletes (track and field) at the 2012 Summer Olympics
Athletes (track and field) at the 2016 Summer Olympics
Athletes (track and field) at the 2011 Pan American Games
Athletes (track and field) at the 2015 Pan American Games
Athletes (track and field) at the 2019 Pan American Games
Pan American Games competitors for Haiti
Haitian male hurdlers
World Athletics Championships athletes for Haiti
Competitors at the 2018 Central American and Caribbean Games
Julmis, Jeffrey